Meili Yinyuehui is the original debut album by Twelve Girls Band / 女子十二乐坊. It consists of one disc with eight songs, and a second disc with ten songs in modernized Chinese form.

The album was released in 2001 as a limited press of a few thousand copies by Nanjing Yinxiang. This album still has the original member selection, which slightly changes thereafter. According to Nanjing Yinxiang, numerous pirated versions of the album are sold worldwide.

Track listing

Disc 1
 S.D花园 "S.D Garden"
 相爱已无 "I Can't Be Your Man"
 自由 "Free"
 预知 "Anticipation"
 嗨！向吧哈致敬 "Hey! A Tribute to Bach"
 魂之舞 "Spirit Dance"
 都市夜曲 "City Night"
 感谢年华 "Thanks for Age"

Disc 2
 春梦 "Dream of Spring"
 五拍 "Take Five"
 无词 "No Words"
 塞琳娜之歌 "Song for Selina"
 午夜心境 "Midnight Mood"
 节奏之中 "Rhythm Within"
 茉莉花 "Jasmine Flower"
 爱的读法 "Spell of Love"
 勇往直前 "Go Straight Ahead by Way"
 康定情歌 "Kang Ding Qing Ge"

2001 albums
Twelve Girls Band albums